James Weir (August 5, 1863 – April 8, 1949) was a provincial level politician from Alberta, Canada. He was born in Elginfield, Ontario.

Political history
Weir was elected to the Legislative Assembly of Alberta in the 1917 Alberta general election. He defeated incumbent MLA John Glendenning in a hotly contested three-way race that separated first from third place by 31 votes. Weir was elected as an Independent and affiliated with the Non-Partisan League.

Weir only served a single term in the assembly did not run again after dissolution in 1921.

References

External links

1863 births
1949 deaths
Independent Alberta MLAs